This article gives an overview of liberalism in Lithuania. Liberalism was a major force in Lithuania since 1900. Next to the urban citizens, agrarian liberal parties became active. It is limited to liberal parties with substantial support, mainly proved by having had a representation in parliament. The sign ⇒ denotes another party in that scheme. For inclusion in this scheme it isn't necessary so that parties labeled themselves as a liberal party.

History
After the restoration of independence in 1990 liberal parties arose again. Currently, the Liberal Movement and Freedom and Justice are centre-right liberal parties, and the Freedom Party is a centrist liberal party.

Lithuanian Democratic Party
1902: Liberal intellectuals and dissident social democrats formed the Lithuanian Democratic Party (Lietuvių Demokratų Partija).
1905: The LDP sponsored the forming of the ⇒ Lithuanian Peasants Union
1914: The LDP is renamed into Democratic Party of Lithuania (Lietuvos Demokratų Partija)
1917: A left wing faction formed the Lithuanian Popular Socialist Democratic Party and a moderate faction formed the ⇒ Democratic National Freedom League.
1920: The party is dissolved

From Lithuanian Peasants' Union to Lithuanian Popular Peasants' Union
1905: The ⇒ Lithuanian Democratic Party sponsored the foundation of the Lithuanian Peasants' Union (Lietuvos Valstiečių Sąjunga), a party working under supervision of the LDP
1920: The party became an independent party
1922: The party merged with the ⇒ Lithuanian Socialist Popular Democratic Party into the Lithuanian Popular Peasants' Union  (Lietuvos Valstiečių Liaudininkų Sąjunga) under the leadership of Mykolas Sleževičius and Kazys Grinius
1935: The party is banned, but continued in exile
1990: It is refounded as a conservative-agrarian party

Lithuanian Socialist Popular Democratic Party
1917: A left wing faction of the  ⇒ Lithuanian Democratic Party formed the Lithuanian Popular Socialist Democratic Party (Lietuvos Socialistų Liaudininkų Demokratų Partija)
1922: The party merged with the ⇒ Lithuanian Peasants' Union into the ⇒ Lithuanian Popular Peasants'  Union

From Democratic National Freedom League to Farmers Party
1917: A moderate faction of the ⇒ Lithuanian Democratic Party formed the Democratic National Freedom League (Demokratinė Tautos Laisvės Santara)
1925: The party is renamed into the Farmers Party (Ūkininkų Partija)
1928: The party is banned, but continued in exile

From Lithuanian Liberal Union to Freedom Party
1990: In newly independent Lithuania liberals formed the Lithuanian Liberal Union (Lietuvos Liberalų Sąjunga).
1993: The Lithuanian Centre Union (Lietuvos Centro Sąjunga) is founded.
2002: A populist faction of the LLS formed the Liberal Democratic Party (Liberalų Demokratų Partija).
2003: The party merged with the ⇒ Lithuanian Centre Union and the Modern Christian Democratic Union into the Liberal and Centre Union (Liberalų ir Centro Sąjunga).
2002: An agrarian faction of the LCS formed the Lithuanian Centre Party (Lietuvos Centro Partija).
2006: The Liberals' Movement of the Republic of Lithuania was formed by the dissident members of LiCS.
2008: The National Resurrection Party (Tautos Prisikėlimo Partija) is founded.
2011: The TPP merged into the ⇒ LiCS.
2019: The Freedom Party (Laisvės Partija) was formed by the former members of LRLS.

New Union Social Liberals
1998: Artūras Paulauskas launched the New Union (Social Liberals) (Naujoji sąjunga (socialliberalai))
2011: The party merged into the ⇒ Labour Party

Lithuanian Freedom Union (Liberals) to Freedom and Justice
2011: The YES – Homeland Revival and Perspective (TAIP – Tėvynės atgimimas ir perspektyva) is founded by Artūras Zuokas.
2014: The Liberal and Centre Union merged with YES into the ⇒ Lithuanian Freedom Union (Liberals) (Lietuvos Laisvės Sąjunga (Liberalai)).
2020: The Lithuanian Freedom Union (Liberals) merged with Order and Justice (originally ⇒ Liberal Democratic Party) into ⇒ Freedom and Justice (Laisvė ir teisingumas).

Liberal leaders
Jonas Vileišis - Mykolas Sleževičius - Kazys Grinius - Petras Auštrevičius - Remigijus Šimašius - Viktorija Čmilytė-Nielsen - Aušrinė Armonaitė

Liberal think tanks
 Lithuanian Free Market Institute (LLRI)
 Taikomosios politikos institutas (TPI)

See also
 History of Lithuania
 Politics of Lithuania
 List of political parties in Lithuania

 
Lithuania
Political movements in Lithuania